WYHI (99.9 FM) is a radio station licensed to Park Forest, Illinois, south of Chicago, with its transmitter located south of Peotone, Illinois. WYHI is an owned and operated affiliate of the Bible Broadcasting Network.

History

WKAK
From its launch in 1962 until 1975, the station had the call sign WKAK. The station was originally owned by Kenneth Baker, Willis Maltby, and Claude Baker. The station began broadcasting January 5, 1962, and was originally licensed to Kankakee, Illinois, with its transmitter located 2.9 miles north of the city limits, and it had an ERP of 6.6 kw at an HAAT of 210 feet. It was the only FM station in Kankakee at the time.

In the 1960s, the station aired an easy listening format, though in 1969 it began adding Hot 100 selections in the evening. By 1972, the majority of the station's playlist was popular music, with standards comprising a quarter of the station's playlist. In June 1972, the station's format was changed to country & western. In late 1974, Claude Baker and Luella Feller sold the station to Harry Fitzgerald, Howard Dybedock, and Benedict Cerven, Sr. for $132,315.

WBYG
On April 7, 1975, the station's call sign was changed to WBYG, and the station was branded "The Big One". As WBYG, the station began airing an adult contemporary format. In 1979, the station's transmitter was moved to Peotone, Illinois, along the Kankakee County/Will County border, and its ERP and HAAT were increased to 50kw and 500 feet respectively. By 1979, WBYG would begin airing an album-oriented rock format, with top 40 music from 6 to 9 AM. The station continued airing an album-oriented rock format into the 1980s. In early 1984, Harry Fitzgerald, Howard Dybedock, and Ben Cerven sold the station to Gene Milner Broadcasting for $1.2 million.

The Bus
On February 15, 1985, the station's call sign was changed to WBSW. The station was branded as "The Bus". The Bus initially aired a contemporary album rock format. Shortly after the station's launch, a 20 foot long bus shaped balloon used to advertise the station broke loose from its tethers and floated away, prompting the FAA to issue a warning to pilots. Soon thereafter, the Bus would go on to air a CHR format. The station's call sign was changed to WBUS on April 1, 1987. The station aired Casey's Top 40 on Sunday mornings, and aired dance mixes at night. The Bus lasted until 1996, when Milner Broadcasting sold the station to Z-Spanish Network for $7 million. "The Bus" branding would return to a CHR station in the area in 1998, on 100.7 WBVS in Coal City, Illinois.

Spanish language formats
Z-Spanish Network launched a regional Mexican format on the station, branded "La Zeta". On September 23, 1996, the station's call sign was changed to WRZA. In 2000, Z-Spanish Network was acquired by Entravision Communications. On December 29, 2000, the station changed to a Spanish CHR format branded "Super Estrella", which was simulcast on sister station WZCH 103.9 in Dundee, Illinois. In May 2001, the station's city of license was changed from Kankakee, Illinois to Park Forest, Illinois. In 2004, Entravision Communications sold the station, along with 750 AM WNDZ, to Newsweb Corporation for $24 million.

Nine FM and Dance Factory
In June 2004, Newsweb launched an adult hits format on the station, branded as "Nine FM", with the slogan "We Play Anything". After Newsweb purchased other rimshot stations, Nine FM's programming expanded to WKIE (92.7 FM) in the north suburbs and WDEK (92.5 FM) west of the Chicago area on November 29, 2004. Sky Daniels was the original program director for Nine FM. When he left in 2005, he was replaced by Matt DuBiel.

In 2006, Chris Chudzik began leasing air time for a dance music show called Dance Factory. Initially airing overnight on Saturdays, the program was expanded to seven nights a week on May 14, 2007. Dance Factory continued to air overnight until Newsweb sold the station, even as the station's daytime format changed.

Progressive talk
Newsweb Corporation dropped the Nine FM programming on all three signals Monday, October 20, 2008, and replaced it with a simulcast of sister station WCPT 820's progressive talk programming from 5 A.M. until 9 P.M. The Nine FM format moved to WKIF 92.7 in Kankakee. The station's call sign was changed to WCPQ on October 27, 2008.

Polski FM
On June 2, 2014, WCPQ and WCPY broke away from the Progressive Talk simulcast and changed their format to Polish-language news, talk and music, branded as "Polski FM". After the station's sale to Bible Broadcasting Network, Polski FM briefly moved to WMFN AM 640.

Bible Broadcasting Network
On March 20, 2018, it was announced that Newsweb would sell WCPQ to Bible Broadcasting Network for $5,099,000. The sale was consummated on May 31, 2018, at which point the new owners changed the station's call sign to WYHI. The station joined the Bible Broadcasting Network on June 12, 2018.

References

External links

YHI
Radio stations established in 1962
1962 establishments in Illinois
Bible Broadcasting Network
YHI